The Abou Telfane Faunal Reserve is a protected area located in Chad. It was established in 1955.

References

Faunal reserves
Protected areas of Chad
Protected areas established in 1955
1955 establishments in Chad